is a video game for the Nintendo Entertainment System published in Japan in 1989 by Natsume and North America in 1990 by the Milton Bradley Company. It is a horizontally scrolling shooter in the vein of Gradius and R-Type taking place inside the intestinal tract of a giant alien organism. Abadox has a high difficulty, and it takes one hit from an enemy projectile to be killed and restart from a checkpoint passed before death.

Plot
In the year 5012, the planet Abadox is eaten by a giant alien organism known as Parasitis. Having consumed Abadox, the alien takes the form of the planet and seeks to devour other planets. The galactic military launches an attack but is destroyed by Parasitis who goes on to devour the hospital ship carrying Princess Maria. Second Lieutenant Nazal, the only surviving fighter of the galactic fleet, attempts to enter Parasitis's body and rescue Princess Maria before it is too late.

Gameplay
The gameplay largely follows the conventions of side-scrolling shooters of the time. The player shoots down various enemies, almost all of which look like various internal organs (brains, eyes and even cilia). The player can also pick weapons and power-ups. Power-ups include speed boosters, increased firepower, homing missiles and shields similar to the "Option" featured in Gradius. For weapons, the player starts with the normal single shot, but can upgrade to a 3-way gun, a spread fire gun, a laser and a hoop-like weapon. However, like most shooters, if the player is killed, all of the upgrades will be lost and the player will have to restart from the last checkpoint. In some cases, if the player dies, they may have to navigate through enemy fire with slow speed, which could prove more difficult than ever.

Another aspect of Abadox that sets the game off from other shooters is the second, fourth and sixth stages. The play style changes from a side-scrolling perspective to a vertical one, but instead of scrolling upwards like a typical vertical shooter, the stage scrolls downward. The final stage involves an escape sequence where the player must navigate out of the alien's rectal cavity before the alien implodes. This falls in suit with a Konami game, Life Force, to which Abadox bears a striking resemblance.

Audio
The music and sound effects for Abadox were produced by Kiyohiro Sada (credited as K. Sada), who composed music for several NES games from Konami, such as Contra, Blades of Steel and Rush'n Attack.

Reception
Critics have generally looked at Abadox favorably for its design, but negatively for its high level of difficulty.

Allgame gave the game a rating of 3 stars out of a possible 5.

See also
S.C.A.T.: Special Cybernetic Attack Team

References

External links
Abadox: The Deadly Inner War manual

1989 video games
Fictional planets
Horizontally scrolling shooters
Milton Bradley Company video games
Natsume (company) games
Nintendo Entertainment System games
Nintendo Entertainment System-only games
Science fiction video games
Single-player video games
Video games developed in Japan
Video games scored by Kiyohiro Sada
Video games set in the future